The Ystalyfera television relay station is sited on high ground to the south of the towns of Ystalyfera and Gurnos in the middle Swansea Valley. It was originally built in the 1980s as a fill-in relay for UHF analogue television covering the communities of Ystalyfera, Gurnos, Ystradgynlais and parts of Seven Sisters. It consists of a 55 m self-supporting lattice steel mast standing on a hillside which is itself about 350 m above sea level. The transmissions are beamed northeast to cover all these targets. The Ystalyfera transmission station is owned and operated by Arqiva.

Ystalyfera transmitter re-radiates the signal received off-air from Carmel about 30 km to the west. When it came, the digital switchover process for Ystalyfera duplicated the timing at Carmel with the first stage taking place on 26 August 2009 and with the second stage being completed on 23 September 2009. After the switchover process, analogue channels had ceased broadcasting permanently and the Freeview digital TV services were radiated at an ERP of 10 W each.

Channels listed by frequency

Analogue television

1 July 1977 - 1 November 1982
The Ystalyfera transmitting station entered full programme service on 1 July 1977.

1 November 1982 - 26 August 2009
Ystalyfera (being in Wales) transmitted the S4C variant of Channel 4.

Analogue and digital television

26 August 2009 - 23 September 2009
The UK's digital switchover commenced at Carmel (and therefore at Ystalyfera and all its other relays) on 26 August 2009. Analogue BBC2 Wales on channel 45 was first to close, and HTV Wales was moved from channel 49 to channel 45 for its last month of service. Channel 49 was replaced by the new digital BBC A mux which started up in 64-QAM and at full power (i.e. 1 W).

Digital television

23 September 2009 - present
The remaining analogue TV services were closed down and the digital multiplexes took over on the original analogue channels' frequencies.

References

External links
The Transmission Gallery: Ystalyfera

Transmitter sites in Wales
Carmel UHF 625-line Transmitter Group